Clackline Nature Reserve is the largest nature reserve in the Shire of Northam. The reserve is extends east to Clackline–Toodyay Road, south to  before Great Eastern Highway, and west to an unnamed road that runs north-west from Refractory Road.
It is listed on the non-statutory Register of the National Estate.

Description

Clackline Nature Reserve has two distinct landforms. To the west is a gently undulating terrain and in the east the land is dissected into steep sided valleys and ridges. Vegetation is chiefly woodland with variation in trees with soil type. They include jarrah, marri wandoo, powderbark wandoo, brown mallet, rock sheoak, Christmas tree and bull banksia. A rare species of orchid not known in any other reserve occurs, Caladenia × triangularis .

Vegetation
There are a range of soil types across Clackline Nature Reserve, with clays, sandy clays and loamy soils in the lower sections of the topography, while pallid zone clays are exposed on erosional slopes, and gravely soils occur at the top of breakaways. There is a similar diversity of vegetation, with wandoo at the low points, powderbark on the slopes, and jarrah or marri woodland on the breakaway tops. There are five general patterns of vegetation based around these species:

The reserve contains the rare plant species Acacia aphylla (leafless rock wattle) and the priority two flora species Papistylus grandiflorus (also known as Stenanthemum grandiflorum).

Fauna
Clackline Nature Reserve is home to a variety of different species. Typical mammals in the reserve are the western grey kangaroo (Macropus fuliginosus), western brush wallaby (M. irma), euro (M. robustus), echidna (Tachyglossus aculeatus) and rabbit. A variety of reptiles are present, including at least five frogs, four geckos,
three legless lizards, one dragon, two goarina, five skink, and five snake species; and there are more than fifty species of bird, notably the wedge-tailed eagle and dusky woodswallows.

History

Background
Though part of a north-south ridge system, the Clackline area has been easily accessed for many years due to the gap through which Clackline Brook, Great Eastern Highway, and the former Eastern Railway passed. While the southern area was released for agriculture and settlement, the area to the north was too rugged, postponing its release. In 1928, an application was made to purchase land in the area.

Establishment
A nearby resident, botanist Ray Paynter, coordinated an effort to protect the Clackline area for conservation purposes in the 1960s and 70s. The Department of Mines opposed the idea, even though the operators of Clackline Refractory, which mined in the area, were supportive. Paynter and the Clackline community continued to push for the creation of a reserve. On 3 March 1973, she wrote to Northam MLA Ken McIver, citing the species of birds, orchids, and kangaroos that would benefit. Nine months later, on 21 December 1973, a reserve "was set aside for the Conservation of Flora and Fauna".

Expansion

One of the conditions for environmental approval for clearing for construction of Fiona Stanley Hospital was that " ... of breeding and limited foraging habitat for Carnaby's Black-Cockatoo has been secured for purchase as is to be included in the Clackline Nature Reserve".
Approximately  of suitable vegetation was purchased in 2008/09 for inclusion into the reserve. The process of including the purchased land in the reserve had commenced by May 2009.

References

Further reading
 
 Western Australia Department of Conservation and Environment, The Darling system, Western Australia, The System 6 Study Report to the Environmental Protection Authority, Report No. 8, April 1981.
 

 Required attribution: © Commonwealth of Australia 2013.

Clackline, Western Australia
Nature reserves in Western Australia